Mahmoud Mollaghasemi Tabrizi (born 5 April 1929) is a retired Iranian freestyle wrestler. He won a silver medal at the 1951 World Championships and a bronze medal at the 1952 Olympics.

Mollaghasemi was the eldest child in a large family. He lost his father, a shoemaker by trade, at an early age, and had to start working to support his family. He took up wrestling aged 18. After retiring from competitions he worked as a wrestling coach and international referee, and attended the 1964 Olympics in this capacity.

References

1929 births
Living people
Olympic wrestlers of Iran
Wrestlers at the 1952 Summer Olympics
Iranian male sport wrestlers
Olympic bronze medalists for Iran
Olympic medalists in wrestling
World Wrestling Championships medalists
Medalists at the 1952 Summer Olympics
20th-century Iranian people